Arzoo Lakhnavi (born Syed Anwar Hussain; 16 February 1873  17 Apr 1951), also known by the honorary title Allamah Arzoo Lakhnavi, was an Urdu poet and lyricist. He wrote almost in every genre of Urdu poetry such as marsiya, qasida, mathnawi, rubaʿi, naʽat, chronogram inscriptions and particularly gazals and lyrics throughout his life, and by the latter wrote radio plays and scripts for several uncertain Urdu films.

He was born to a poet Mir Zakir Hussain 'Yas' as Syed Anwar Hussain around 16 February 1873 in North-Western Provinces, British India (in modern-day Lucknow, India). He was the elder brother of an Urdu poet, Mir Yusuf Hussain 'Qayas'.

Biography 
He was associated with poetry during his school days. He was taught by Jalal Lakhnavi, an Urdu poet. He received his initially schooling at his home and later went to Lucknow where he studied  Persian and Arabic languages. He wrote his first marsiya at an apparent age of twelve. In 1942, he went to Bombay where he established his association with Hindi film industry. Following the partition, he later migrated to Pakistan where he remained associated with the Radio Pakistan in Karachi. He wrote poetry in various forms, however he earned his recognition with gazals. His uncertain authorship includes seven diwans such as Fughan-e-Arzoo, Jahan-e-Arzoo and Nishan-e-Arzoo consisting twenty-five thousand gazals. He earned "Allamah" title primarily for gazal writings. Most of his work, particularly gazals revolves around romance. He wrote lyrics for Hindi films such as Karoon Kya Aas, Dushman, Street Singer among others. He also wrote a book titled Sureeli Bansuri in Hindustani language.

He died on 17 April 1951 in Karachi, Pakistan.

References

Further reading

External links 
 Arzoo Lakhnavi at Rekhta

1873 births
1951 deaths
20th-century Pakistani poets
Urdu-language poets from Pakistan
Poets from Karachi
Muhajir people
Urdu-language lyricists
Writers from Lucknow
Poets in British India